Bunuk (also Romanized as Būnūk) is a village in Surak Rural District, Lirdaf District, Jask County, Hormozgan Province, Iran. At the 2006 census, its population was 16, in 4 families.

References 

Populated places in Jask County